The rial (sign: ریال ; abbreviation: Rl (singular) and Rls (plural) or IR in Latin; ISO code: IRR) is the official currency of Iran.

There is no official symbol for the currency but the Iranian standard ISIRI 820 defined a symbol for use on typewriters (mentioning that it is an invention of the standards committee itself) and the two Iranian standards ISIRI 2900 and ISIRI 3342 define a character code to be used for it. The Unicode Standard has a compatibility character defined .

A proposal has been agreed to by the Iranian Parliament to drop four zeros, by replacing the rial with a new currency called the toman, the name of a previous Iranian currency, at the rate of 1 toman = 10,000 rials.

History

The rial was first introduced in 1798 as a coin worth 1,250 dinars or one-eighth of a toman. In 1825, the rial ceased to be issued, with the qiran subdivided into 20 shahi or 1,000 dinars and was worth one-tenth of a toman, being issued as part of a decimal system. The rial replaced the qiran at par in 1932, subdivided into 100 new dinars.

Prior to decimalisation in 1932, these coins and currencies were used, and some of these terms still have wide usage in Iranian languages and proverbs:

Value

In 1932, the rial was pegged to sterling at a rate of £1 = Rls 59.75. The exchange rate was £1 = Rls 80.25 in 1936, £1 = Rls 64.350 in 1939, £1 = Rls 68.8 in 1940, £1 = Rls 141 in 1941 and £1 = Rls 129 in 1942. In 1945, the rial was pegged to the U.S. dollar at USD 1 = Rls 32.25. The rate was US$1 = Rls 75.75 in 1957. Iran did not follow the dollar's currency devaluation in 1973, leading to a new peg of USD 1 = Rls 68.725. The dollar peg was dropped in 1975.

In 1979, Rls 70 equalled USD 1. The value of the rial declined precipitously after the Islamic Revolution because of capital flight from the country. Studies estimate that the flight of capital from Iran shortly before and after the revolution in the range of $30 to $40 billion. Whereas on March 15, 1978, Rls 71.46 equalled $1, in July 1999, $1 equalled Rls 9,430.

Injecting sudden foreign exchange revenues in the economic system forms the phenomenon of "Dutch disease" in a country. There are two main consequences for a country with Dutch disease: loss of price competitiveness in its production goods, and hence the exports of those goods; and an increase in imports. Both cases are clearly visible in Iran.

Although described as an (interbank) "market rate", the value of the Iranian rial is tightly controlled by the central bank. The state ownership of oil export earnings and its large reserves, supervision of letters of credit, together with current – and capital outflow account – outflows allows management of demand. The central bank has allowed the rial to weaken in nominal terms (4.6% on average in 2009) in order to support the competitiveness of non-oil exports.

There is an active black market in foreign exchange, but the development of the TSE rate and the ready availability of foreign exchange during 2000 narrowed the differential to as little as IR100 in mid-2000. However, the spread increased again in September 2010 because channels for transferring foreign currency to and from Iran being blocked because of international sanctions.

Monetary policy is facilitated by a network of 50 Iranian-run forex dealers in Iran, the rest of the Middle East and Europe. According to the Wall Street Journal and dealers, the Iranian government was selling US$250 million daily to keep the rial exchange rate against the US dollar between Rls 9,700 and Rls 9,900 in 2009. At times (before the devaluation of the rial in 2013) the authorities weakened the national currency intentionally by withholding the supply of hard currency to earn more rial-denominated income, usually at times when the government faced a budget deficit.

The widening of the gap between official and unofficial exchange rates stood at over 20% in November 2011. This shows the correlation between the value of foreign currencies and the domestic inflationary environment.

The unofficial rial to US dollar rate underwent severe fluctuations in January 2012 (the rial losing 50% of its value in a few days, following new international sanctions against the CBI), eventually settling at Rls 17,000 at the end of the period. Besides all the bad effects on the economy in general, this had the effect of boosting the competitiveness of Iran's domestic industries abroad. Following President Mahmoud Ahmadinejad's decision to liberalize the mechanism by which bank interest rates are set (granting banks the authority to raise interest rates to 21%), CBI announced that it would be fixing the official rate of the rial against the dollar at Rls 12,260 from January 28, 2012, and seek to meet all demand for foreign currency through banks.

As of June 2020, the Iranian rial has fallen almost five-fold since the beginning of 2018 and contributing to the record inflation. Reason cited by analysts is the fact that the government has been printing money in excess of the economic growth.

The value of Rial has dropped by 29% since the nationwide protests that began on September 16, following the death of Mahsa Amini, a 22 year old Kurdish-Iranian woman in police custody.

Pre-unification, rials per US dollar:
Market: 8,200 (2002); 8,050 (2001); 8,350 (2000)
Preferred: 6,906 (2002); 1,753 (2001); 1,764 (2000)

Exchange rate system
Until 2002, Iran's exchange rate system was based on a multi-layered system, where state and para-state enterprises benefited from the "preferred or official rate" (Rls 1,750 for US$1) while the private sector paid the "market rate" (Rls 8,000 for US$1), hence creating an unequal competition environment. The "official rate" applied to oil and gas export receipts, imports of essential goods and services, and repayment of external debt. The "export rate", fixed at Rls 3,000 per dollar since May 1995, applied to all other trade transactions, but mainly to capital goods imports of public enterprises.

In 1998, in order to ease pressure on exporters, the central bank introduced a currency certificate system allowing exporters to trade certificates for hard currency on the Tehran Stock Exchange, thus creating a floating value for the rial known as the "TSE rate" or "market rate". This method finally replaced the fixed "export rate" (Rls 3,000:US$1) in March 2000, and has since held steady at some Rls 8,500:US$1.

In March 2002, the multi-tiered system was replaced by a unified, market-driven exchange rate. In 2002 the "official rate" a/k/a "preferred rate" (Rls 1,752:US$1) was abolished, and the TSE rate became the basis for the new unified foreign-exchange regime. Iran's Central Bank channels more than 90 per cent of hard currency into the local market (2012).

Forex bourse

In a move interpreted as aiming at unifying currency exchange rates, on September 24, 2012, the government launched a foreign exchange centre, that would provide importers of some basic goods with foreign exchanges, at a rate about 2% cheaper than the open market rate on a given day. This project was cancelled following the strong depreciation of the rial between 2012 and 2013 but was put on the agenda again in 2015 for use in the reunification of forex rates (planned for 2017) and the introduction of currency derivatives. through the Iran Mercantile Exchange.

In addition to banks, exchange shops are also available for limited transactions. Exchange shops must operate under the licenses issued by Central Bank of Iran. Foreign currencies can be bought or sold at these exchange shops.

Exchange restriction
Exchange restriction arises from limitations on the transferability of rial profits
from certain investments under the Foreign Investment Promotion and Protection Act and from limitations on other investment-related current international payments under this act.

Multiple currency practices
In 2010, the cases of multiple currency practices arose from the following:
Budget subsidies for foreign exchange purchases in connection with payments of certain letters of credit opened prior to March 21, 2002, under the previous multiple exchange rate system (see above);
Obligations of entities that had received allocations of foreign exchange at subsidized "allocated rates" under the previous multiple exchange rate system to surrender unused allocations to the Central Bank of Iran at the allocation rate.

Until 2012, the dollar had different exchange rates, depending on where you are buying your currency

Official exchange rate
Free trade zone exchange rate
Referential exchange rate
Black market exchange rate

In 2012, Bank Markazi classified a long list of goods into categories with priorities 1 through 10, leaving it to the parallel market to take of all other needs. Priorities 1 and 2 are food and medicine, receiving foreign exchange at the official rate of Rls 12,260 per dollar, followed by other categories with lower priorities, which are mostly intermediate goods used in industrial production.

Redenomination
Because of the current low value of rial, and that people rarely use the term, redenomination or change of currency has been proposed a number of times since the late 1980s. The issue has re-emerged and been under discussion, as a result of issuance of larger banknotes in 2003. Opponents of redenomination are wary of more inflation resulting from psychological effects, and increase in velocity of money leading to more instabilities in the economy of Iran.

On April 12, 2007, the Economics Commission of the Parliament announced initiation of a statute in draft to change the currency, claiming redenominations had helped reduce inflation elsewhere, such as in Turkey.  In 2008, an official at the Central Bank of Iran said the bank plans to slash four zeros off the rial and rename it the toman.  The bank printed two new traveller's cheques, which function quite similar to a banknote, with values of Rls 500,000 and Rls 1,000,000. However, they have the figures "50" (should read 50 thousand toman) and "100" (should read 100 thousand toman) written on their top right hand corners, respectively, which is seen as the first step toward a new currency.

In 2010, President Mahmoud Ahmadinejad announced that Iran would remove three zeros (not the four that had been proposed) from its national currency as part of the economic reform plan.

In April 2011, it was reported that the Central Bank is working on a six-month redenomination project to cut four zeros from the national currency and replace old bank notes with new ones, similar to the revaluation of the Turkish lira in 2005.

A website to poll the public on the redenomination plan was launched July 21, 2011; the public was allowed to vote on how many zeroes to cut and what the new currency's name should be. Preliminary results indicate that four zeroes would be cut (in line with the government's recommendation) and that the name will be changed to Parsi.

In 2016, the government announced its plan to end the official status of the rial, replacing it with the commonly used unit the toman (which represents 10 rials).

In July 2019, the Iranian government approved a bill to change the national currency from the rial to the toman with one toman equalling Rls 10, a process which will reportedly cost $160 million. This proposal was approved by the Iranian parliament in May 2020. The changeover is likely to be phased over a period of up to two years.

CIA market manipulation
It was reported in 2007 that a U.S. Central Intelligence Agency (CIA) plan had been authorized to manipulate the Iranian rial in order to destabilize the country, though the details and outcome of said plan are not known. Iran reported arresting 20 "Forex manipulators" in 2012.

In 2013, talking about the sanctions against Iran, US Senator Carl Levin said that "Iranian Rial banknotes are printed in Europe".

Coins

Classical rial

Modern rial
The first coins of the second rial currency, introduced in 1932, were in denominations of 1, 2, 5, 10 and 25 dinars, Rl , Rl 1, Rls 2 and Rls 5, with the Rls  to Rls 5 coins minted in silver. Gold coins denominated in pahlavi were also issued, initially valued at Rls 100. In 1944, the silver coinage was reduced in size, with the smallest silver coins being the Rls 1 pieces. Minting of all denominations below 25 dinars ended in this year. In 1945, silver Rls 10 coins were introduced. In 1953, silver coins ceased to be minted, with the smallest denomination now 50 dinars. Rls 20 coins were introduced in 1972.

After the Islamic Revolution, the coinage designs were changed to remove the Shah's effigy but the sizes and compositions were not immediately changed. 50 dinar coins were only minted in 1979 and Rls 50 coins were introduced in 1980. In 1992, a new coinage was introduced with smaller Rls 1, Rls 5, Rls 10 and Rls 50 coins and new Rls 100 pieces. Rls 250 coins were introduced the following year. In 2004, the sizes of the Rls 50, Rls 100 and Rls 250 coins were reduced and Rls 500 coins were introduced. New, smaller types of Rls 250 and Rls 500 were introduced in 2009, along with the new denomination of Rls 1,000. Rls 2,000 and Rls 5,000 rial coins in 2010.

Digital Rial

Digital Rial or Iran's National Currency is a type of currency that according to the announcement of the Central Bank of the Islamic Republic of Iran, Its release is based on the Modern Rial.

Current series

Banknotes
In 1932, notes were issued by the "Bank Melli Iran" in denominations of Rls 5, Rls 10, Rls 20, Rls 50, Rls 100 and Rls 500. Rls 1,000 notes were introduced in 1935, followed by Rls 200 notes in 1951 and Rls 5,000 and Rls 10,000 in 1952. Rls 5 notes were last issued in the 1940s, with Rls 10 notes disappearing in the 1960s. In 1961, the Central Bank of Iran took over the issuance of paper money.

In 1979, after the Islamic revolution, Iranian banknotes featuring the Shah's face were counter-stamped with intricate designs to cover the Shah's face. The first regular issues of the Islamic Republic were in denominations of Rls 100, Rls 200, Rls 500, Rls 1,000, Rls 5,000 and Rls 10,000. Rls 2,000 notes were introduced in 1986.

They are issued by the Central Bank of Iran, each bearing the signature of the President of the Iranian Central Bank. The Rls 100, Rls 200 and Rls 500 banknotes are becoming increasingly uncommon; shopkeepers habitually give out small packages of gum in lieu of the last Rls 500 of change. For day to day means people will carry wads of Rls 100,000 notes.

Qajar Series (1850–1925)

Reza Shah Series (1925–1941)

Mohammad Reza Shah Series (1942–1978)

Imam Reza Shrine Series (1980–1982)

Revolution Series (1981–2005)

Ruhollah Khomeini Series (1992–2019)

Intergenerational series (2019–2023) 
In preparation for an upcoming redenomination whereby Rls 10,000 will become one toman, notes of this series display the numerical value in tomans as well as rials (the latter with the trailing four zeros de-emphasized). Due to a shortage of paper currency, higher denominations have been issued as cheques rather than legal tender banknotes.

2019
Rls 500,000 (50 tomans) cheque 

2020
Rls 100,000 (10 tomans) 
Rls 1,000,000 (100 tomans) cheque 

2021
Rls 10,000 (1 toman)
Rls 20,000 (2 tomans)
Rls 50,000 (5 tomans)

Issuance of larger notes
Printing banknotes larger than Rls 10,000 was first proposed in 1989, and in 1992 the central bank asked for government permission to print Rls 20,000, Rls 50,000 and Rls 100,000 notes. This was not realized at that time, due to fears of inflation and counterfeiting. The Rls 10,000 note remained the highest valued banknote for more than 50 years until 2005, when a Rls 20,000 banknote was introduced and subsequently a Rls 50,000 banknote was introduced with the subject being the Iranian nuclear energy program. The note was issued March 12. The note features a quote by the prophet Mohammed, translated as: "Even if knowledge is at the Pleiades, the people from the land of Persia would attain it".
Banknotes currently in circulation are Rls 100, Rls 200, Rls 500, Rls 1,000, Rls 2,000, Rls 5,000, Rls 10,000, Rls 20,000, Rls 50,000 and Rls 100,000. After the death of Ruhollah Khomeini, his portrait was used on the obverse of Rls 1,000 banknotes and greater.

Cash cheques

Currently the highest valued legal tender banknote issued by the central bank is Rls 100,000 (about US$0.24 on Dec. 25, 2022). However Rls 500,000 and Rls 1,000,000 Iran Cheques circulate freely and are treated as cash.

The central bank used to allow major state banks to print their own banknotes known as "cash cheques". They were a form of bearer teller's-cheque with fixed amounts, printed in the form of official banknotes. Once they were acquired from banks, they could function like cash for a year. Two forms of these banknotes were available. One known as "Iran cheque" could be cashed in any financial institution, while the other could be cashed at the issuing bank. They were printed in denominations of Rls 200,000, Rls 500,000, Rls 1,000,000, Rls 2,000,000 and Rls 5,000,000.

In 2008, CBI revoked this privilege from banks, and currently issues its own Iran Cheques in denominations of Rls 500,000 and Rls 1,000,000.

Printing
Security Paper Mill (called TAKAB) is a paper mill and a subsidiary of the Central Bank of Iran responsible for production of security papers, including those of the Iranian rial banknotes located in the city of Amol.

See also
 Electronic currency in Iran
 Iranian qiran
 Iranian toman
 International rankings of Iran in economy
 Shetab Banking System
 Economy of Iran
 Iranian Oil Bourse
 Saudi riyal

References

External links
 Iran Collection, a website about Persian banknotes and coins since Qajar era.
 Statistics, Central Bank of Iran
 (information on currency exchange and credit card payment)
Latest news about Iran currency, Financialtribune, The First Iranian English Economic Daily
Videos
 Iran's gold and currency markets Iran's gold and currency markets (Press TV 2012)
 Gold market and currency exchange in Iran - Part I Part II Part III (Press TV)
  (Press TV)

Currencies of Iran
Currencies introduced in 1798
Currencies introduced in 1932
Currency symbols